The Professor Jayashankar Telangana State Agricultural University (PJTSAU) is a state agriculture university, which was separated from the central Acharya N. G. Ranga Agricultural University in the year 2014 as a result of the bifurcation of Andhra Pradesh.

Headquarters and colleges
The university has its headquarters at Rajendranagar, Hyderabad.

It has the following colleges:

 College of Agriculture, Rajendranagar
 Agricultural College, Jagtial
 Agricultural College, Aswaraopeta
 Agricultural College, Palem
 Agricultural college, Siricilla

History 
The university was established on 12 June 1964, with O.Pulla Reddy as the first vice-chancellor. It was formally inaugurated on 20 March 1965, by Lal Bahadur Shastri, the then Prime Minister of India in Hyderabad. On 23 June 1966, another milestone was the inauguration of the building program of the university by Indira Gandhi, the then Prime Minister of India.

Post bifurcation of Andhra Pradesh, it was renamed as Professor Jayashankar Telangana State Agricultural University and the headquarters of Acharya N. G. Ranga Agricultural University was shifted from Hyderabad to Guntur.

According to the Andhra Pradesh Agricultural University Act, 1963, Colleges of Agriculture and Veterinary Science, Hyderabad (affiliated to Osmania University), Agricultural College, Bapatala (affiliated to Andhra University), Sri Venkateswara Agricultural College and Andhra Veterinary College, Tirupati (affiliated to Sri Venkateswara University) were transferred to the new university in June 1964. About 41 agricultural research stations and four research stations were transferred to the university in July 1966 and May 1967, respectively.

References

Agricultural universities and colleges in India
Educational institutions established in 2014
2014 establishments in Telangana
State universities in Telangana